SFLS may refer to:

San Francisco Law School
Shenzhen Foreign Languages School
Shanghai Foreign Language School